Orfeh (born March 28, 1971 as Orfeh Or) is an American singer, songwriter and actress.  Orfeh and her husband, Andy Karl, performed at the Lincoln Center's American Songbook Series in 2016, and in the Broadway musicals Saturday Night Fever, Legally Blonde, and Pretty Woman.

Early life and career 
Orfeh was born and raised in New York City. She attended the LaGuardia High School for the Performing Arts and received a record deal shortly after graduation. Her first release was Life in the Movies, which she released as a part of the group Genevha with her musical partner Mike More in 1987. After the release, the duo formed the group Or-N-More and signed with EMI Records.

In 1991, the duo released a self-titled album, their single "Everyotherday" reached number 46 on the Billboard Hot 100. The album was awarded gold status, but shortly after the album's success, the duo found out their business manager had mis-managed their finances. She has been quoted about the situation, "My recording career went wrong. Really, really wrong. We had the business manager that stole all the money, the hit record that was about to become a mega-hit record and suddenly the rug was pulled out from under us. After being on the road for years and devoting my life to recording, I found myself at home saying, 'What do I do now?'"

After Or-N-More disbanded, Orfeh signed a publishing deal with Warner/Chappell Music and continued to write and produce songs for other artists. She also remains a member of the National Academy of Recording Arts and Sciences, which gives her nominating and voting privileges for the Grammy Awards. She also co-wrote the song "Wishing On You," which appears on the soundtrack of the Disney film Model Behavior that was released in 2000.

Broadway 
Orfeh made her Broadway debut in 1998 as a swing in Footloose. In early 1999, Orfeh joined the ten-member company of The Gershwins 'Fascinating Rhythm with Adriane Lenox, Sara Ramirez and Patrick Wilson. She then starred in the Original Broadway Company of London musical of Saturday Night Fever as Annette, and in addition to winning positive reviews, Orfeh met her husband, Andy Karl, while playing the role. In 1999, she appeared on The Rosie O'Donnell Show to promote the musical and perform her solo from the show, If I Can't Have You.

After Saturday Night Fever closed, Orfeh starred in Me and Mrs. Jones and Bright Lights, Big City at the Prince Theatre in Philadelphia. In 2001, she played Janis Joplin in the off-Broadway show, Love, Janis. In 2005, she starred in the off-Broadway musical The Great American Trailer Park Musical as Pippi, a stripper from the wrong side of the tracks.

In 2007, Orfeh was nominated for a Tony Award for her performance in the Legally Blonde musical. She played the   role of Paulette, a down on her luck hairdresser who helps Elle on her journey, while finding love of  her own. She also received Outer Critics Circle and Drama Desk nominations for her performance. Her husband, Andy Karl, starred opposite her as her UPS man, Kyle. Orfeh stayed with the show until it closed on October 19, 2008. From July 20, 2018, through August 18, 2019, she played the role of Kit De Luca in Pretty Woman on Broadway.

 Television and film 
In addition to television appearances, she is a frequently used voiceover artist and has voiced characters for the videogames Max Payne 2, Grand Theft Auto: San Andreas and The Warriors. She also has done voiceover work for Wachovia bank.

 Music 

Orfeh released her first solo album, What Do You Want from Me, on September 30, 2008. In 2014, Orfeh recorded a song for Michael Mott's album, "Where The Sky Ends" which was later released as a dance mix. In 2015, she released the Christmas-themed single Baby Please Come Home. In 2016, Orfeh and her husband performed at the Lincoln Center's American Songbook series. That same year, she was featured on the single What the World Needs Now is Love with other Broadway artists and released the solo single, Forget My Name.

 Personal life 
In 2001, she married actor Andy Karl, a three-time Tony-nominated actor whom she met during her time in Saturday Night Fever, and who played opposite her as Paulette's UPS man, Kyle in the original cast of Legally Blonde. The couple splits their time between Manhattan and Los Angeles.

 Discography Releases'

References

External links 
 Orfeh's official page at MySpace
 
 
 Star File: Orfeh at Broadway.com
 Q&A: Orfeh at Broadway.com

American film actresses
American stage actresses
American television actresses
American video game actresses
Living people
Actresses from New York City
American musical theatre actresses
1971 births
20th-century American actresses
American voice actresses
21st-century American actresses
20th-century American singers
20th-century American women singers
21st-century American singers
21st-century American women singers
Singers from New York City